In enzymology, an UDP-galactopyranose mutase is an enzyme that catalyzes the chemical reaction

UDP-D-galactopyranose  UDP-D-galacto-1,4-furanose

Hence, this enzyme has one substrate, UDP-D-galactopyranose, and one product, UDP-D-galacto-1,4-furanose.

This enzyme belongs to the family of isomerases, specifically those intramolecular transferases transferring other groups.  The systematic name of this enzyme class is UDP-D-galactopyranose furanomutase.

UDP-D-galactofuranose then serves as an activated sugar donor for the biosynthesis of galactofuranose glycoconjugates. The exocyclic 1,2-diol of galactofuranose is the epitope recognized by the putative chordate immune lectin intelectin.

Structural studies

Because UGM is not present in the mammalian systems but is essential among several pathogenic microbes, the enzyme is an attractive antibiotic target.

References

 

EC 5.4.99
Enzymes of known structure